Pantulu means Guru in the South Indian language Telugu, and may refer to: 

 Tanguturi Prakasam Pantulu (1872–1957), Indian politician and Freedom Fighter and the first Chief Minister of Andhra Pradesh
 Kasinadhuni Nageswara Rao (died 1938), better known as Nageswara Rao Pantulu, Indian journalist, nationalist and politician
 Gidugu Venkata Ramamurthy (1863-1940), better known as 'Gidugu Ramamurthy Pantulu', Telugu writer and linguist
 Nyapati Subba Rao Pantulu (1856–1941), Indian politician and social activist
 Kandukuri Veeresalingam Pantulu (1848–1919), Indian social reformer and writer